Soe Pyae Thazin (born 22 September 1992) is a Myanmar Academy Award winning Burmese actress and singer. She won her first special Myanmar Academy Award for Best Supporting Actress with the film Moe Nya Einmet Myu in 2009 at the age of 18. She has achieved fame and success as an actress and singer. Throughout her career, she has acted in over 100 films.

Early life and career
Soe Pyae was born in Yangon and grew up in Taungoo, Myanmar. She started her acting career in nine grade. Since she was young she won so many awards at school contest for her signing, playing guitar and piano. Later she moved to Yangon again to become a singer and her first song was "I Really Love You, My Love" where she sang at her cousin's wedding. Later she stars in a movie and became famous as an actress; gaining more fans at her first leading role movie with Nay Toe in "The Time Of Solar Eclipse". Her first solo album, "Chit Thu Yway Mal" (Having Found Love) was released in 2012.

Family
She comes from the Soe family, her family is well-known and famous in Myanmar. Her father is a veterinarian and her mother is a teacher. Her cousins include actresses Soe Myat Thuzar and Soe Myat Nandar, as well as hip hop artist Sandi Myint Lwin.

Donations
Soe Pyae Thazin made a donation to the Aggapay Metta Youth Development Orphanage on September 22 to mark her 22nd birthday.

Filmography

Film

 Moe Nya Einmet Myu (2009)
 A Lann Lun A Lun Lann (2012)
 A Mike Sar (2013)
 Chit San Eain 2028 (2015)
 Kan Ma Pha La (2020)
 Golden Princess (2020)

Television series
 Beautiful Wives Club (2018)
 Lu Lu Sein (2020)

Discography

Solo albums
Chit Thu Yway Mal (Having Found Love)  (2012)

Awards

References

External links

1992 births
Living people
Burmese film actresses
21st-century Burmese actresses
Burmese female models